Rivo Rakotovao (born 12 May 1960) is a Malagasy politician who served as Acting President of Madagascar from 2018 to 2019. Rakotovao also served as President of the Senate of Madagascar.

Acting President of Madagascar
On September 7, 2018, President Hery Rajaonarimampianina submitted his resignation from the presidency, an act required by law in order to participate in the upcoming presidential election. As a result, Rivotovao, the President of the Senate, assumed the role of President, a position he held until the inauguration of the then President-Elect Andry Rajoelina . On September 9, the United Nations Secretary-General, António Guterres, reaffirmed his support for Rivo Rakotovao. On June 14, 2022, Rivo Rakotovao was summoned by the Independent Office for the Fight against Corruption, on suspicion of corruption, embezzlement of public funds and abuse of office.

References

}

1960 births
Living people
Presidents of Madagascar
Presidents of the Senate (Madagascar)